Haplochromis michaeli is a species of cichlid endemic to Lake Victoria though it may now be extinct.  This species can reach a length of  SL. The specific name honours the collector of the type, the British fisheries scientist Michael Graham (1888-1972).

References

michaeli
Fish described in 1928
Taxonomy articles created by Polbot